Obren Popović was a Serbian basketball player. He represented the Yugoslavia national basketball team internationally.

Playing career 
Popović played for a Belgrade-based team Crvena zvezda of the Yugoslav First League during 1950s. He won 3 Yugoslav Championships.

National team career 
Popović was a member of the Yugoslavia national basketball team that participated at the 1955 European Championship in Budapest, Hungary. Over ten tournament games, he averaged 8.1 points per game while shooting 62.2 percent from the field.

Career achievements and awards 
 Yugoslav League champion: 3 (with Crvena zvezda: 1953, 1954, 1955).

See also 
 List of KK Crvena zvezda players with 100 games played

References

1934 births
KK Crvena zvezda players
Serbian men's basketball players
Yugoslav men's basketball players
Date of birth missing
Year of death missing
Place of birth missing
Place of death missing